The 1988 Fusagasugá City Council election was held on Sunday, 13 March 1988 accord Legislative Act 01 1986. In this election were elected the first mayors through popular vote.

References 

1988
Regional elections